Yves Engler (born 1979) is a Canadian Montreal-based writer and political activist. In addition to twelve published books, Engler's writings have appeared in alternative press and in mainstream publications such as The Globe and Mail, Toronto Star, Ottawa Citizen, and Ecologist.

His 2009 book, The Black Book of Canadian Foreign Policy, was short-listed for the Quebec Writers' Federation Mavis Gallant Prize for Nonfiction.

Studies and activism

Concordia University
Engler moved to Montreal to study at Concordia University in the early 2000s, where he was elected vice president of communications with the Concordia Student Union. He was suspended from the university due to his involvement in the Concordia University Netanyahu riot, which erupted in response to a visit to the campus by former Israeli Prime Minister Benjamin Netanyahu. The riot involved the breaking of windows at a number of university buildings and assaults on Holocaust survivors.

A student tribunal found Engler guilty of assault and vandalism for his part in the event. Engler contends he never assaulted anyone or committed any vandalism during the riot. His attempt to appeal the suspension was rejected by the Supreme Court of Canada. Engler's suspension was later made permanent when he violated a ban on political activity imposed by the university in the aftermath of the riot.

Haiti
Engler was critical of Canada's role in the 2004 Haitian coup d'état. He co-authored a report entitled Canada in Haiti: Waging War Against the Poor Majority and helped establish a group called the Canada-Haiti Action Network.

In June 2005, Engler interrupted a press conference being held by then-Canadian Minister of Foreign Affairs Pierre Pettigrew. Engler poured a bottle of cranberry juice onto Pettigrew and said, "Pettigrew lies, Haitians die." The juice was meant to represent the blood Engler said was on the hands of the Canadian government due to its alleged involvement in the 2004 coup and subsequent United Nations peacekeeping mission.

Israel and antisemitism
Engler condemns antisemitism. He has said that he is sometimes falsely accused of antisemitism because of his support for the international campaign for Boycott, Divestment and Sanctions against Israel because of the Israeli occupation of the Palestinian territories.

In 2016, Engler wrote an essay for the Huffington Post, titled "'Anti Semitism': The Most Abused Word in Canada". A week later, Canadian Jewish News editor Yoni Goldstein criticized all aspects of this text in an opinion piece. He concluded that Engler "has seriously misjudged the state of anti-Semitism in Canada today". Engler offered an explanation of the controversy on his webpage, in which he recognised the shortcomings of the 2016 article, and apologized "to anyone who feels I crossed the line".

Published works
 Canada in Haiti: Waging War on the Poor Majority with Anthony Fenton. Co-published by RED Publishing and Fernwood Publishing, August 2005. 
 Playing Left Wing: From Rink Rat to Student Radical (RED/Fernwood Publishing, 2005)
 The Black Book of Canadian Foreign Policy. Co-published by RED Publishing and Fernwood Publishing, April 2009. 
 Canada and Israel: Building Apartheid. Co-published by RED Publishing and Fernwood Publishing, February 2010. 
 Stop Signs: Cars and Capitalism on the Road to Economic, Social and Ecological Decay with Bianca Mugyenyi, Published April 2011; 
 Lester Pearson's Peacekeeping The Truth May Hurt.  Fernwood Publishing (September 1, 2012)
 The Ugly Canadian: Stephen Harper's Foreign Policy. Co-published with: Red Publishing  (Published: 2012)
 Canada in Africa: 300 years of aid and exploitation. Co-published by RED Publishing and Fernwood Publishing, August 2015. 
  A Propaganda System — How Government, Corporations, Media and Academia Sell War and Exploitation, Fall 2016.
 Left, Right: Marching to the Beat of Imperial Canada. Black Rose Books, 2019. 
 House of Mirrors: Justin Trudeau's Foreign Policy. RED Publishing/Black Rose Books, 2020
 Stand on Guard for Whom? — A People's History of the Canadian Military, October 2021

References

External links

 
 Collection of Engler's Z net writings

Video Links
 Canada vs Latin American Democracy a 6-part series -  Part 1 of 6: "From Jacobins to Salvador Allende, Hugo Chavez and Jean Bertrand Aristide". Introduction by The Globe and Mail columnist Rick Salutin.
 "The Ugly Canadian"'' - Numerous interviews on Stephen Harper and Canadian foreign policy on The Real News network.

1979 births
Activists from Montreal
Canadian activists
Canadian political writers
Living people
Writers from Montreal
Writers from Vancouver